Go North East operates both local and regional bus services in County Durham, Cumbria, Northumberland, North Yorkshire and Tyne and Wear, England. It was previously known as the Northern General Transport Company and Go-Ahead Northern. The company was the foundation of today's Go-Ahead Group, which now operates bus and rail services across the United Kingdom, as well as Germany, Ireland, Norway and Singapore.

History
In February 1987, as part of the privatisation of the National Bus Company, a management buyout led by Chris Moyes and Martin Ballinger saw the purchase of the Northern General Transport Company.

At deregulation in October 1986, Northern, which was rebranded as Go Ahead Northern, operated from fourteen depots at Gateshead (Sunderland Road) Winlaton, High Spen, Wallsend, Percy Main, South Shields, Jarrow, Consett, Stanley, Washington, Chester le Street, Sunderland (Park Lane), Philadelphia and Murton, with the head office and central works and Bensham in Gateshead.

 Early expansion saw the acquisition of a number of smaller competing bus operators in the region, including Langley Park-based Gypsy Queen in January 1990 and Bishop Auckland-based OK Motor Services in March 1995. In January 2012, the OK Motor Services branding was briefly revived, to celebrate the company's centenary year.

In February 1990, the company's depot at Murton was closed, with the loss of 20 jobs. The remaining 109 staff were redeployed to other depots, the majority going to Sunderland (Park Lane) and the remainder to Philadelphia. The loss-making depot at Jarrow, and the depot at High Spen, which was making a marginal profit, was closed towards the end of September 1990. Following the closures, a total of 20 jobs were lost, with a further 150 staff redeployed.

By January 1991, Go-Ahead Northern had split into five companies within the parent company: Coastline, Go-Ahead Gateshead, Northern, VFM and Wear Buses.

In August 1998, a new depot was opened at Deptford Terrace in Sunderland, which saw the closure of the nearby depot at Park Lane, as well as Philadelphia Lane in Houghton-le-Spring, with a subsequent transfer of operations, which allowed the demolition of the depot and adjacent bus station in Park Lane, Sunderland, to be redeveloped into the current interchange and subsequent arrival of the Metro extension to Sunderland and South Hylton. The depot at Philadelphia remained standing and was used for a variety of uses, including a car wash, tyre sales and cafe, but was finally demolished in 2022 for redevelopment of the area.

In 2005, the company's depot in the seaside town of South Shields was closed, with operations moved to Deptford depot.

In March 2006, the company's depot in Bishop Auckland was transferred to Arriva North East. Four years later, in March 2010, Go North East's Ashington depot was exchanged with Arriva North East's Hexham depot.

In June 2010, the company was awarded a five-year contract to operate the QuayLink network of services. Award of the contract saw the introduction of a fleet of nine Euro 5 diesel-powered Optare Versa single-deck vehicles.

In February 2014, former depots at Sunderland Road, Gateshead and Winlaton were replaced by an £8.5million "super depot", known as Riverside. The  site, located in Dunston has capacity for over 160 vehicles and 500 staff.

In June 2018, Hull-based East Yorkshire Motor Services was acquired by Go-Ahead, bringing an end to 30 years of family ownership. Following acquisition, the company was rebranded East Yorkshire, and will continue to run as a standalone company within Go North East.

In March 2019, the Stanley depot was closed, after almost 100 years in service. Operations were subsequently moved to a new  depot at Hownsgill Industrial Estate, Consett, which is located on the site of the former Consett Steelworks. The £3.5million depot has the capacity for 63 vehicles and 180 staff.

In November 2020, a fleet of nine zero-emission Yutong E10 fully-electric single-deck buses were introduced on routes 53 and 54, as part of a jointly-funded project between Go North East and the Government's Ultra-Low Emission Bus Fund – at a cost of £3.7 million. The circular routes serve Gateshead, Quayside, Newcastle and Saltwell Park up to every 12 minutes, with vehicles branded in a green and silver livery.

In February 2022, a further zero-emission vehicle trial took place, when a zero-emission Wright StreetDeck Electroliner fully-electric double-deck bus was evaluated on route 21. The route runs up to every 7–10 minutes between Brandon, Durham, Chester-le-Street and Newcastle.

In March 2022, the company's Peterlee outstation was closed, with operations transferred to neighbouring Chester-le-Street and Deptford depots.

In June 2022, it was announced that East Yorkshire would be split from Go North East, becoming a separate company of the Go-Ahead Group. Following the departure of Martijn Gilbert in August 2022, the former Go North West Managing Director, Nigel Featham, assumed Gilbert's role at Go North East. At East Yorkshire, former Area Manager, Ben Gilligan, has been promoted to Managing Director. In the same month, plans were also announced to close the company's Chester-le-Street depot.

Fleet and operations

Depots 
As of September 2022, the company operates from seven bus depots across the region: Consett (Hownsgill), Gateshead (Riverside & Saltmeadows Road), Hexham, Percy Main, Sunderland (Deptford) and Washington.

Vehicles
As of 19 December 2021, the fleet consists of 648 buses and coaches. The fleet consists mainly of diesel-powered single and double-deck buses manufactured by Alexander Dennis, Mercedes-Benz, Optare, Scania, Volvo and Wrightbus. The company also operate a fleet of eighteen fully-electric single-deck vehicles: nine Yutong E10 ,which were introduced in November 2020, as well as a further nine Yutong E12 ,introduced in September 2022.

Branding

In 2006, Go North East introduced route branding. The practice aimed to give each service, or group of services, a recognisable identity, colour scheme and logo. Route branding has led to the company adopting a multi-coloured fleet.

Until 2013, the standard fleet livery consisted of red, blue and yellow. Following this, vehicles without route branding were painted in a red livery. In 2016, a new standard livery was introduced, with vehicles painted red at the front, and blue at the back, separated by a white strip, with a tagline and website featuring above the windows. This proved to be short-lived, and in 2019, a new-style standard livery has been introduced. This features a lighter shade of blue at the rear, with the curved white separation strip being replaced with a double white and yellow line.

Regional and national coach services operating under contract to National Express are painted in a mostly white livery, featuring the client's blue and red logo. In early 2020, a fleet of coaches were repainted into a range of retro-inspired heritage liveries, with a number of single and double-deck buses following later.

Notes

References

External links

Go North East Limited on Companies House
Go North East website

Bus operators in Tyne and Wear
Go-Ahead Group companies
Transport companies established in 1987
1987 establishments in England